The 1952–53 IHL season was the eighth season of the International Hockey League (IHL), a North American minor professional ice hockey league. Six teams participated in the regular season, and the Cincinnati Mohawks won the Turner Cup.

Regular season

Turner Cup-Playoffs

Turner Cup playoffs

Semifinals
Cincinnati Mohawks 4, Toledo Mercurys 1

Grand Rapids Rockets 4, Troy Bruins 2
{|class="wikitable" width="70%"
|- align="center"  
| Game || Date || Visitor || Score || Home || Series || Arena || Attendance
|- align="center"  
| 1 || March 10 || Grand Rapids Rockets || 3-9 || Troy Bruins || 1–0 || Hobart Arena || 1,548
|- align="center"  
| 2 || March 11 || Troy Bruins || 2-5 || Grand Rapids Rockets || 1-1 || Stadium Arena || N/A
|- align="center" 
| 3 || March 14 || Troy Bruins || 1-6 || Grand Rapids Rockets || 2–1|| Stadium Arena || N/A
|- align="center" 
| 4 || March 15 || Grand Rapids Rockets || 2-6 || Troy Bruins || 2-2 || Hobart Arena || 3,256
|- align="center"  
| 5 || March 18 || Troy Bruins || 0-2 || Grand Rapids Rockets || 3-2|| Stadium Arena || N/A
|- align="center" 
| 6 || March 21 || Troy Bruins || 3-6 || Grand Rapids Rockets || 4-2|| Stadium Arena || N/A
|}

Turner Cup FinalsCincinnati Mohawks 4, Grand Rapids Rockets 0'''

Awards

Coaches
Cincinnati Mohawks: Buddy O'Connor
Fort Wayne Komets: Alex Wood
Grand Rapids Rockets: Louis Trudel
Milwaukee Chiefs: Ed Bruneteau
Toledo Mercurys: Doug McCaig
Troy Bruins: Norm McAtee

References

Attendance Figures - Cincinnati Enquirer 03-12-1953 through 04-01-1953

External links
 Season 1952/53 on hockeydb.com 

IHL
International Hockey League (1945–2001) seasons